is a professional Japanese baseball player. He plays outfielder for the Hiroshima Toyo Carp.

External links

 NPB.com

1985 births
Living people
Hiroshima Toyo Carp players
Japanese baseball players
Nippon Professional Baseball first basemen
Nippon Professional Baseball left fielders
Nippon Professional Baseball right fielders
Baseball people from Kagoshima Prefecture